Tirjerd Rural District is in the Central District of Abarkuh County, Yazd province, Iran. At the National Census of 2006, its population was 5,513 in 1,474 households. There were 5,792 inhabitants in 1,710 households at the following census of 2011. At the most recent census of 2016, the population of the rural district was 5,927 in 1,843 households. The largest of its 162 villages was Maryamabad, with 1,335 people.

References 

Abarkuh County

Rural Districts of Yazd Province

Populated places in Yazd Province

Populated places in Abarkuh County